Multiple Choice is a novel published by the Chilean author Alejandro Zambra in 2014 (originally under the title Facsímil). Megan McDowell's English translation was published by Penguin Books in 2016. The novel uses the structure and questions of the Chilean Academic Aptitude Test as its organizing principle. Called both a work of parody and poetry, Multiple Choice examines the role of the education system and standardized testing in promoting compliance to authoritarian rule.

References

Penguin Books books
2014 Chilean novels